Epischnia sareptella is a species of snout moth in the genus Epischnia. It was described by Patrice J.A. Leraut in 2002 and is known from Russia.

References

Moths described in 2002
Phycitini